The Woodlands, located at 408 East Main Street, is a nine-story condominium building in Lexington, Kentucky. It includes a restaurant and a covered parking structure. Construction was completed in 1984.

Tenants can own condominiums or rent, making it a great downtown living location.

See also
 Cityscape of Lexington, Kentucky

References

Residential condominiums in the United States
Residential buildings in Lexington, Kentucky
Residential buildings completed in 1984